Clarendon Hills is a village in DuPage County, Illinois, United States. The population was 8,702 at the 2020 census. It is a south-west suburb of Chicago.

History
The area that is now Clarendon Hills was a wide, rolling prairie bordering the east side of Westmont. Most of the older villages in Downers Grove Township were built on the same street grid as the Village of Downers Grove. Instead, Clarendon Hills was built to resemble nearby Riverside, a planned, park-like suburb designed by Fredrick Law Olmsted in the late 1800's. Its long winding streets go with the natural contour of the land, rather than extending straight through from the neighboring towns. In 1923, at the time of incorporation, Clarendon Hills had a population of under 900 people. The area was incorporated to avoid annexation by the nearby affluent community of Hinsdale. 

The Clarendon Hills Historical Society is tasked with retaining the town's history and establishing a community center and a museum to display prominent artifacts pertaining to the history of the village.

In 1961, TWA Flight 529 crashed in Clarendon Hills, killing all 73 passengers on board.

On May 11, 2022, a Metra train collided with a box truck on the Prospect Avenue grade crossing; one person lost her life.

Geography
Clarendon Hills is located at  (41.796030, -87.955960). It is approximately 18 miles southwest of Chicago.

Demographics
As of the 2020 census there were 8,702 people, 3,431 households, and 2,317 families residing in the village. The racial makeup of the village was 80.66% White, 1.47% African American, 0.11% Native American, 8.47% Asian, 1.79% from other races, and 7.49% from two or more races. Hispanic or Latino of any race were 5.96% of the population.

There were 3,431 households, out of which 81.43% had children under the age of 18 living with them, 61.18% were married couples living together, 4.52% had a female householder with no husband present, and 32.47% were non-families. 31.42% of all households were made up of individuals, and 19.76% had someone living alone who was 65 years of age or older. The average household size was 3.30 and the average family size was 2.57.

The village's age distribution consisted of 31.8% under the age of 18, 4.7% from 18 to 24, 20.6% from 25 to 44, 29.7% from 45 to 64, and 13.3% who were 65 years of age or older. The median age was 41.3 years. For every 100 females, there were 88.4 males. For every 100 females age 18 and over, there were 78.9 males.

The median income for a household in the village was $103,486, and the median income for a family was $175,801. Males had a median income of $117,564 versus $41,888 for females. The per capita income for the village was $67,540. About 11.0% of families and 8.6% of the population were below the poverty line, including 6.8% of those under age 18 and 1.5% of those age 65 or over.

Transportation 
Clarendon Hills has a station on Metra's BNSF Railway Line, which provides daily rail service between Aurora, Illinois and Chicago, Illinois (at Union Station). Additionally, Pace operates connecting bus services. Currently, bus lines 663 and 664 serve Clarendon Hills.

Schools 
Clarendon Hills is in Community Consolidated School District 181, with Clarendon Hills Middle School (grades 6–8), Prospect School (grades K-5), and Walker School (grades K-5). The superintendent of the schools is Dr. Don White. Notre Dame Parish School (grades PK-8) is also located in the village. Parts of Clarendon Hills are also located within Maercker District 60, with Holmes School (grades K-2), Maercker School (grades 3–6), and Westview Hills Middle School (grades 6–8).

Clarendon Hills Middle School (CHMS) is one of the two 6-8th grade schools in district 181. It is one of 5 public middle schools that feed into Hinsdale Central High School. Approximately 700 students were enrolled in CHMS for the 2009–10 school year. CHMS was recently ranked by the Chicago Tribune as the 14th best middle school in the state (based on ISAT scores). More than 96% of the students' test scores were categorized as meeting or exceeding the Illinois Learning Standards.

In 2009, the Clarendon Hills Middle School was awarded with a Blue Ribbon by the United States Department of Education, recognizing it as one of the top schools in the nation. CHMS is ranked in the top 2% of middle schools in Illinois.

Prospect School had an approximate enrollment of 449 students for the 2009–10 school year.
Walker School had an approximate enrollment of 305 students for the 2009–10 school year. 
Together with CHMS all are rated 10 out of 10 by greatschools.net.

Notable people 

 Bill Evans, jazz musician
 Bill Laimbeer, former basketball center with the back-to-back 1989-1990 NBA Champion Detroit Pistons
 Emily Montague Schwartz, Symbionese Liberation Army member
 Brian Wardle, basketball head coach, Bradley University

References

External links

 
1924 establishments in Illinois
Populated places established in 1924
Villages in DuPage County, Illinois
Villages in Illinois